Bakboord is a surname. Notable people with the surname include:

 (born 1959), Surinamese anthropologist, feminist and singer
Navajo Bakboord (born 1999), Dutch footballer 
Winston Bakboord (born 1971), Dutch footballer